Albertine Anne Thackwell (12 July 1863 – 22 September 1944) was a British archer who competed at the 1908 Summer Olympics in London. She was born in Alcester. Thackwell competed at the 1908 Games in the only archery event open to women, the double National round competition. She took 15th place in the event with 484 points.

References

External links
 profile
 
 

1863 births
1944 deaths
British female archers
Olympic archers of Great Britain
Archers at the 1908 Summer Olympics
People from Alcester